Gentleman's Diary or The Mathematical Repository was (a supplement to) an almanac published at the end of the 18th century in England,  including mathematical problems.

The supplement was also known as: "The mathematical repository: an almanack" or "A Collection of mathematical problems and ænigmas".
 Serial Publication: Annual 5 v. tables. 16 cm
 Publisher: Printed for J. Fuller (1741–1745)
 Place of publication: London, England
 Continued by: The Ladies' Diary and then The Lady's and Gentleman's Diary
 Language: English
 OCLC: 5535685
 Journal began: 1741 Ceased publication: 1800
 Libraries worldwide that own item: University of Illinois, University of Oklahoma

External links
 List of Journals that have Mathematical Problem Columns at MathPro Press
 Online copy

See also
 List of scientific journals in mathematics
 The Ladies' Diary
 The Lady's and Gentleman's Diary

Mathematics journals